Gantt is a census-designated place (CDP) in Greenville County, South Carolina, United States. The population was 14,229 at the 2010 census. It is part of the Greenville–Mauldin–Easley Metropolitan Statistical Area and a suburb of the city of Greenville.

Geography
Gantt is located in west-central Greenville County at  (34.781918, -82.397938). It is bordered to the northeast by the city of Greenville and to the northwest by unincorporated Dunean.

Interstate 85 passes through the center of the community, with access from exits 44 through 46. I-85 leads northeast  to Spartanburg and southwest  to Atlanta. U.S. Route 25 passes through Gantt as White Horse Road, intersecting I-85 at Exit 44. US 25 leads north  to Parker, a western suburb of Greenville, and south  to Greenwood. Downtown Greenville is 6 miles to the north via US 25 and US 29.

Demographics

2020 census

As of the 2020 United States census, there were 15,006 people, 5,555 households, and 3,488 families residing in the CDP.

2000 census
At the 2000 census there were 13,962 people, 5,361 households, and 3,854 families living in the CDP. The population density was 1,387.5 people per square mile (535.9/km). There were 5,793 housing units at an average density of 575.7 per square mile (222.3/km).  The racial makeup of the CDP was 33.86% White, 63.10% African American, 0.14% Native American, 0.34% Asian, 0.05% Pacific Islander, 1.40% from other races, and 1.10% from two or more races. Hispanic or Latino of any race were 3.00%.

Of the 5,361 households 33.5% had children under the age of 18 living with them, 42.6% were married couples living together, 23.4% had a female householder with no husband present, and 28.1% were non-families. 24.1% of households were one person and 6.9% were one person aged 65 or older. The average household size was 2.60 and the average family size was 3.07.

The age distribution was 27.6% under the age of 18, 8.4% from 18 to 24, 28.8% from 25 to 44, 24.0% from 45 to 64, and 11.2% 65 or older. The median age was 36 years. For every 100 females, there were 89.7 males. For every 100 females age 18 and over, there were 84.3 males.

The median household income was $33,811 and the median family income  was $39,280. Males had a median income of $31,184 versus $22,028 for females. The per capita income for the CDP was $20,106. About 11.7% of families and 13.9% of the population were below the poverty line, including 18.7% of those under age 18 and 12.1% of those age 65 or over.

References

Census-designated places in Greenville County, South Carolina
Census-designated places in South Carolina
Upstate South Carolina